Kamarina is a village of Preveza regional unit, in the region of Epirus, in western Greece. It is located about 25 kilometres north of the town of Preveza, at an elevation of 400 metres. Kamarina belongs to the Zalongo municipality. Nowadays, its population is around 400 citizens. The ruins of ancient Cassope are situated 1 km north of the village.

Populated places in Preveza (regional unit)